Nonsan station is a KTX station on the Honam Line. Nonsan station opened in November 1911, and Nonsan's old name was 'Hwangsan'. The Honam KTX began to stop on April 1, 2004.

References

External links
 Cyber station information from Korail (archived snapshot)

Railway stations in South Chungcheong Province
Nonsan
Railway stations opened in 1911
Korea Train Express stations